The 2014–15 season of the Primera División de Fútbol Sala was the 26th season of top-tier futsal in Spain. It was the fourth season under the "Primera División" name. The regular season started on September 12, 2014 and concluded on April 25, 2015. The championship playoffs followed the end of the regular season.

Inter Movistar were the defending champions, having defeated ElPozo Murcia 3–1 in the 2013–14 Championship Final series to win their ninth title overall and first since 2008.

Colegios Arenas G.C. finished in last place and so were relegated at the end of the 2013-2014 regular season. Levante UD DM were crowned 2013-2014 champions of Segunda División de Futsal and were promoted automatically. Uruguay Tenerife won the promotion playoffs 2-1 over Elche and were the other team to be promoted to the Primera División for the 2014-2015 season.

At the end of the regular season the top eight teams played in the championship playoffs.

Teams

Regular season table

Championship playoffs

Calendar

Bracket

Quarter-finals

1st match

2nd match

3rd match

Semifinals

1st match

2nd match

3rd match

Final

1st match

2nd match

3rd match

4th match

Top scorers
Regular season only

See also
2014–15 Segunda División de Futsal

References

2014–15
2014–15 in Spanish futsal
Spain